Kaspar Braun (13 August 1807 – 29 October 1877) was a German wood engraver.

Biography

He was born at Aschaffenburg, first studied painting in the Munich Academy, and then turned his attention to wood engraving, in which he received instruction from Brevières in Paris and Dessauer in Munich, and in this branch of art he made his career. In conjunction with Dessauer, he established a graphic art institute in Munich in 1839. He became associated with Friedrich Schneider in 1843, and established the humorous publication Fliegende Blätter.

Works
Among the numerous works to which he contributed engravings are the following:
 Das Nibelungenlied, after the drawings of Schnorr and Neureuther
 Volkskalender, with illustrations after Kaulbach and Cornelius
 Göttz von Berlichingen
 Münchner Bilderbogen

Notes

References
 

Attribution:
 

German engravers
1807 births
1877 deaths
People from Aschaffenburg
Academy of Fine Arts, Munich alumni